The 1998 Mid-Eastern Athletic Conference men's basketball tournament took place March 3–7, 1998, at the Richmond Coliseum in Richmond, Virginia.  defeated , 66–61 in the championship game, to win its 3rd MEAC Tournament title.

The Bulldogs earned an automatic bid to the 1998 NCAA tournament as No. 15 seed in the Southeast region. In the round of 64, North Carolina A&T fell to No. 2 seed  Kentucky 82–67.

Format
Nine of 11 conference members participated, with the top 7 teams receiving a bye to the quarterfinal round.

Bracket

* denotes overtime period

References

MEAC men's basketball tournament
1997–98 Mid-Eastern Athletic Conference men's basketball season
MEAC men's basketball tournament
Basketball competitions in Richmond, Virginia
College basketball tournaments in Virginia